Phycodes interstincta is a moth in the family Brachodidae. It was described by Kallies and Arita in 2011. It is found in China (Guangdong).

References

Natural History Museum Lepidoptera generic names catalog

Brachodidae
Moths described in 2011